South Carolina Highway 230 (SC 230) is a  state highway in the U.S. state of South Carolina. The highway connects North Augusta with the Sumter National Forest.

Route description

SC 230 begins at an intersection with SC 23 in the unincorporated community of West Store Crossroads, within Edgefield County. The western end of the highway travels through Sumter National Forest. It travels to the south-southwest and travels through Colliers, where it curves to the south. The highway gradually travels in more and more of a south-southeasterly direction. SC 230 crosses over Horn Creek. Just south of an intersection with Woodlawn Road and Briggs Road, the highway leaves the national forest and crosses over Anderson Branch. After curving back to the south, it crosses over Hardy Creek and Sweetwater Branch. The highway heads to the south-southeast again and travels through Poverty Hill. About  later, it enters North Augusta, in which it is a major urban corridor. It crosses over Fox Creek and Pole Branch immediately before an interchange with Interstate 20 (I-20; Strom Thurmond Freeway). SC 230 has a short south section and passes underneath the North Augusta Greeneway. It then curves to the southeast before intersecting U.S. Route 25 Business (US 25 Bus.; Georgia Avenue). Here, SC 125 Truck begins a concurrency with SC 230. A few blocks later, they intersect US 25/SC 121 (Knox Avenue). Signage on the eastbound side notes that SC 230 ends here, but signage farther to the southeast shows that it continues concurrent with US 25/SC 121, which take on the Martintown Road name. The four highways intersect SC 125 (Atomic Road). Here, SC 230 meets its eastern terminus, and SC 125 Truck meets its southern terminus.

Major intersections

See also

References

External links

SC 230 at Virginia Highways' South Carolina Highways Annex

230
Transportation in Edgefield County, South Carolina
Transportation in Aiken County, South Carolina
North Augusta, South Carolina